This article discusses banking in Cuba and gives an overview of the recent past. For details on the Cuban economy in general, see economy of Cuba.

History
Following the Cuban Revolution of the 1950s, the Cuban banking sector came under the control of the new regime. The new authorities famously appointed Che Guevara as President of the National Bank of Cuba in 1959. Guevara often retold the apocryphal story of how he gained the job at the bank; Fidel Castro had asked if there were an economista in the room and he had put his hand up – much to Castro's surprise. Guevara had mistakenly thought that Castro had asked for a comunista.

Guevara's appointment seemed somewhat ironic, as he often condemned money, favored its abolition, and showed his disdain by signing Cuban banknotes with his nickname, "Che."

The 1990s saw the restructuring of the Cuban banking system, with new commercial banks created, and a new central bank, "Banco Central de Cuba" set up. The architect of this restructuring, Francisco Soberón, became the first president of the new central bank.

Central Bank of Cuba

The Central Bank of Cuba ( - "BCC") functions as the central bank of Cuba.  The Cuban government set it up in 1997 to take over many of the functions of the National Bank of Cuba ( - BNC). Francisco Soberón Valdés served as the Bank's President from its creation until he stepped down in 2009. He was replaced by Ernesto Medina, who had served as president of the state-run Banco Financiero Internacional since 2003 The President of the Central Bank serves ex officio as a member of the Council of Ministers of Cuba.

As with most Cuban government ministries, the Central Bank acts as both banking regulator and shareholder of much of the Cuban banking system.

Current system

Cuba has eight commercial banks, categorisable as follows:

Retail banks

 Banco de Crédito y Comercio (BANDEC)
 Banco Popular de Ahorro (BPA)
 Banco Financiero Internacional (BFI)
 Banco Internacional de Comercio S.A. (BICSA)
 Banco Metropolitano S.A.

Investment bank

 Banco de Inversiones S.A.

Other

 Banco Nacional de Cuba (BNC)
 Banco Exterior de Cuba (BEC)

In addition, the Havana International Bank is registered in London.

Non-banking financial institutions

The Central Bank also regulates a number of other financial institutions, most notably:

 Grupo Nueva Banca, S.A. (New Bank Group) - the principal shareholder of the following entities: Banco Internacional de Comercio, S.A., Financiera Nacional, S.A., Compañía Fiduciaria, S.A., InCreFin, S.A. It also holds 50.0% in the joint venture Financiera Iberoamericana, S.A. and held 40% percent in Caribbean Finance Investments Ltd. (CariFin) (the latter was subsequently dissolved).
 Casas de Cambio, S.A. (CADECA), formed in 1994, this company operates money-exchange kiosks

See also

 Cuban peso
 Cuban convertible peso

References

External links
  Central Bank of Cuba website

Cuba
Economy of Cuba